John Penn (30 March 1848 – 21 November 1903) was a British Conservative Party politician who served as Member of Parliament (MP) for Lewisham from 1891 to 1903.

John Penn was the eldest son of the marine engineer John Penn. He was educated at Harrow School and Trinity College, Cambridge. Though he managed his father's firm, John Penn and Sons, he was not trained as an engineer. He was apparently "one of the best-known Parliamentary golfers, having a fine private course at Archerfield, North Berwick".

References

External links 
 

1848 births
1903 deaths
Conservative Party (UK) MPs for English constituencies
UK MPs 1886–1892
UK MPs 1892–1895
UK MPs 1895–1900
UK MPs 1900–1906
Alumni of Trinity College, Cambridge
People educated at Harrow School